Kim Ho-jun (born 1 May 1990) is a South Korean snowboarder. He was a participant at the 2014 Winter Olympics in Sochi.

References

1990 births
Snowboarders at the 2010 Winter Olympics
Snowboarders at the 2014 Winter Olympics
Snowboarders at the 2018 Winter Olympics
Living people
Olympic snowboarders of South Korea
South Korean male snowboarders
Sportspeople from Seoul
Snowboarders at the 2007 Asian Winter Games
Snowboarders at the 2017 Asian Winter Games
Universiade medalists in snowboarding
Universiade silver medalists for South Korea
Competitors at the 2009 Winter Universiade
Competitors at the 2011 Winter Universiade
21st-century South Korean people